August "Aku" Eskelinen (16 July 1898 – 10 June 1987) was a Finnish biathlete who competed in the 1924 Winter Olympics.

Eskelinen was born in Iisalmi. In 1924 he was a member of the Finnish military patrol team which won the silver medal.

External links
 profile

1898 births
1987 deaths
People from Iisalmi
People from Kuopio Province (Grand Duchy of Finland)
Finnish military patrol (sport) runners
Olympic biathletes of Finland
Military patrol competitors at the 1924 Winter Olympics
Olympic silver medalists for Finland
Medalists at the 1924 Winter Olympics
Sportspeople from North Savo
20th-century Finnish people